The Gillespie Museum is located in DeLand, Florida, on the Stetson University campus. It houses one of the largest gem and mineral collections in the southeast.

Footnotes

Gallery

External links
 The Gillespie Museum – official site

Museums in DeLand, Florida
University museums in Florida
Geology museums in Florida
Natural history museums in Florida
Stetson University